The Slovenian Ice Hockey Cup is the national ice hockey cup in Slovenia.

History
Initially, during the 1990s, the Slovenian Cup was awarded to the best team in the first part of the Slovenian Ice Hockey League season. In the 1999–2000 season, the cup was contested for the first time as a single-elimination tournament. However, the final four, which was scheduled to be played at the new Zalog Arena in Ljubljana, was not held. Instead, the winner was declared during the Rudi Hiti Summer League, an annual ice hockey tournament, and was contested by Olimpija and HK Jesenice. The first official and completed season as recognized by the Ice Hockey Federation of Slovenia was contested during the 2015–16 season, and was won by Olimpija. In the next season, the final between Olimpija and HDD Jesenice was not played due to scheduling conflicts.

List of finals

References

External links
Official website 

National ice hockey cup competitions in Europe
Cup